Hodgemoor Wood is a biological Site of Special Scientific Interest in Chalfont St Giles in Buckinghamshire. It is in the Chilterns Area of Outstanding Natural Beauty, and most of it is leased by Buckinghamshire County Council to the Forestry Commission.

The site is a large area of semi-natural broad-leaved woodland on unusually varied soil types of mottled clays, sands and gravels, and it has a similarly wide range of structure, including ancient coppiced oak, beech and hornbeam. 

The core of the site is ancient woodland, with records going back to the thirteenth century. Ground vegetation includes bracken and brambles, with sedges in wetter areas. Butterflies include white admiral and purple hairstreak, and the nationally rare jewel beetle Agrilus biguttatus has been recorded. There is also a wide variety of breeding woodland birds.

There are extensive tracks with broad rides, walking trails, and cycling paths, and access to the site from Bottrells Lane.

References

External links 

 Hodgemoor website
 Chilterns Area of Natural Beauty, Hodgemoor Woods

Sites of Special Scientific Interest in Buckinghamshire
Forests and woodlands of Buckinghamshire